Pleurotomella rappardi is an extinct species of sea snail, a marine gastropod mollusk in the family Raphitomidae.

Description

Distribution
Fossils of this marine species were found in Oligocene strata in Rhineland, Germany

References

rappardi
Gastropods described in 1867